Enterprise Township may refer to:

Enterprise Township, Ford County, Kansas
Enterprise Township, Reno County, Kansas, in Reno County, Kansas
Enterprise Township, Michigan
Enterprise Township, Jackson County, Minnesota
Enterprise Township, Linn County, Missouri, in Linn County, Missouri
Enterprise Township, Valley County, Nebraska
Enterprise Township, Nelson County, North Dakota, in Nelson County, North Dakota
Enterprise Township, Faulk County, South Dakota, in Faulk County, South Dakota
Enterprise Township, Moody County, South Dakota, in Moody County, South Dakota
Enterprise Township, Roberts County, South Dakota, in Roberts County, South Dakota

Township name disambiguation pages